Divine Fonjock (born 16 January 1984 or 1987) is a Cameroonian footballer, who plays for Badesse Calcio ASD.

Biography
Born in Kumba, Cameroon, Fonjock left for Italy in 2000. Fonjock was a member of Treviso's reserve from 2003–04 season to 2005–06 season. In 2006, he left for SPAL. He played 25 games in 2006–07 Serie C2. Fonjock was in the pre-season camp of Treviso in 2007–08 Serie B, wore no.26 shirt. In August 2007 Fonjock left for Lanciano on loan with option to become co-ownership deal (along with Wilker), but returned to Treviso in the same window. He went to SPAL on 11 January 2008. FIGC later fined Treviso as the deal was notional, as €30,000 transfer fee was missing. SS Lanciano s.r.l. bankrupted in 2008. Fonjock played in 16 games in 2008–09 Serie B but Treviso FBC 1993 s.r.l. bankrupted in 2009 either.

Fonjock left for Ravenna in 2009. He spent 2 seasons in Lega Pro Prima Divisione (ex- Serie C1). Ravenna also bankrupted in 2011. In July 2011 he had a trial at Serie B newcomer Gubbio. However the club did not offered him a contract. He then trailed in Pergocrema, and Reggiana, neither one offered him a place. In March 2012 Montichiari offered a contract but the deal apparently collapsed.

In July 2012 Fonjock joined Latina pre-season camp. He received his first and last first team call-up for 2012–13 Coppa Italia Lega Pro.

International career
Fonjock capped for Cameroon in 2005 African Youth Championship qualification.

Passport controversy
In March 2008 Fonjock failed to renew the resident permit. The authority found his Cameroonian personal identity had two different year of birth, 1984 and 1987, which the latter more commonly appeared as his age in football documents. Fonjock later renewed the permit successfully.

References

External links
 Football.it Profile 
 

Cameroonian footballers
Treviso F.B.C. 1993 players
S.P.A.L. players
S.S. Virtus Lanciano 1924 players
Ravenna F.C. players
Latina Calcio 1932 players
U.S.D. Lavagnese 1919 players
S.S.D. Sanremese Calcio players
Serie B players
Serie C players
Serie D players
Association football midfielders
Cameroonian expatriate footballers
Expatriate footballers in Italy
Cameroonian expatriate sportspeople in Italy
People from Southwest Region (Cameroon)
1987 births
Living people
Cameroon under-20 international footballers